Tevarn Joseph Webber (born 27 August 1993) is a player for the New Zealand rugby union sevens team. He was a member of the New Zealand under-20 squad in 2013. Webber was named in the sevens squad to the 2014 Commonwealth Games.

Of Māori descent, Webber affiliates to the Ngāti Ranginui and Waikato iwi. His sister Jordon Webber is a member of the New Zealand women's sevens team.

Webber was part of the All Blacks Sevens squad that won a bronze medal at the 2022 Commonwealth Games in Birmingham.

References

External links
 
 All Blacks Player Profile 
 
 
 
 

1993 births
Living people
Bay of Plenty rugby union players
Commonwealth Games medallists in rugby sevens
Commonwealth Games rugby sevens players of New Zealand
Commonwealth Games silver medallists for New Zealand
Māori All Blacks players
Medalists at the 2020 Summer Olympics
New Zealand international rugby sevens players
New Zealand male rugby sevens players
New Zealand rugby union players
Ngāti Ranginui people
Olympic medalists in rugby sevens
Olympic rugby sevens players of New Zealand
Olympic silver medalists for New Zealand
People educated at Hamilton Boys' High School
Rugby sevens players at the 2014 Commonwealth Games
Rugby sevens players at the 2016 Summer Olympics
Rugby sevens players at the 2020 Summer Olympics
Rugby union centres
Rugby union fullbacks
Rugby union players from Tokoroa
Rugby union wings
Waikato rugby union players
Waikato Tainui people
20th-century New Zealand people
21st-century New Zealand people
Rugby sevens players at the 2022 Commonwealth Games
Medallists at the 2014 Commonwealth Games
Medallists at the 2022 Commonwealth Games